Boxing at the 1977 Southeast Asian Games took place at Chin Woo Stadium in Kuala Lumpur. Indonesia won the overall championship with all five finalists winning their respective bouts.

Medalists

Medal table

References
All the Results. The Straits Times, 25 November 1977, Page 31. Accessed 29 September 2019
Boxer Tan 'robbed'. The Straits Times, 22 November 1977, Page 23. Accessed 29 September 2019
Krishnan in the Final. The Straits Times, 23 November 1977, Page 23. Accessed 29 September 2019
Times Journal articles 1977
Expressweek articles 1977

External links
Results
Singaporean Medalists

1977 in sports
Boxing at the Southeast Asian Games
1977 Southeast Asian Games events